Larisa Savchenko and Arantxa Sánchez Vicario were the defending champions but they competed with different partners that year, Savchenko with Helena Suková and Sánchez Vicario with Mary Joe Fernández.

Fernández and Sánchez Vicario lost in the quarterfinals to Yayuk Basuki and Caroline Vis.

Savchenko and Suková lost in the semifinals to Nicole Arendt and Manon Bollegraf.

Basuki and Vis won in the final 3–6, 7–5, 6–4 against Arendt and Bollegraf.

Seeds
Champion seeds are indicated in bold text while text in italics indicates the round in which those seeds were eliminated. The top four seeded teams received byes into the second round.

Draw

Final

Top half

Bottom half

External links
 1997 du Maurier Open women's doubles draw

Doubles
1997 du Maurier Open